Edward Ross Barker (born May 31, 1931 – September 6, 2012)  was a National Football League (NFL) end who played for the Pittsburgh Steelers and the Washington Redskins.  He played college football at Washington State University and was drafted in the first round of the 1953 NFL Draft by the Los Angeles Rams. After his short stint playing football he spent 20 years serving in the US Air Force, ending his career as a Lt. Colonel. He was elected into the Washington State University Hall of Fame in 2011.

See also
 List of NCAA major college football yearly receiving leaders

References

1931 births
2012 deaths
American football ends
Pittsburgh Steelers players
Washington Redskins players
Washington State Cougars football players
People from Dillon, Montana
People from Sunnyside, Washington
Players of American football from Washington (state)